Glaucocharis scrotiformis is a moth in the family Crambidae. It was described by Wei-Chun Li and Hou-Hun Li in 2012. It is found in Tibet, China.

References

Diptychophorini
Moths described in 2012